Sins of the Father(s) derives from biblical references primarily in the books Exodus, Deuteronomy, and Numbers to ancestral sin, the sins or iniquities of one generation passing to another.

Print
 Sins of the Father (Buffy novel), a 1999 novel based on Buffy the Vampire Slayer
 Sins of the Father (Judge Anderson novel), a 2006 novel based on Anderson: Psi Division
 The Sins of the Father (Archer novel), 2012
 The Sins of the Father: A Romance of the South, 1912 novel by Thomas Dixon Jr.
 Pirates of the Caribbean: Jack Sparrow: Sins of the Father, 2007 novel
 Sins of the Father, a 1991 novel by William Wright
 The Sins of the Father: Joseph P. Kennedy and the Dynasty He Founded, a 1996 non-fiction book by Ronald Kessler
 "The Sins of the Father", a story arc of the 1999 comic book Anarky
 The Sins of the Fathers, alternative title of A New Lease of Death, 1967 novel by Ruth Rendell
 The Sins of the Fathers, a Matthew Scudder detective novel published in 1976 by Lawrence Block
 The Sins of Our Fathers, a 1970 analysis of the origins of The Troubles in Northern Ireland by Owen Dudley Edwards
 The Sins of Our Fathers, a 2022 novella set in The Expanse book series by James S.A. Corey

Film
 Sins of the Fathers (1928 film), an American silent film
 Sins of the Fathers (1948 film), a Canadian film
 Sins of the Father (1985 film), a television film starring James Coburn
 Sins of the Father (2002 film), a television drama by Robert Dornhelm

Television
 "Sins of the Father" (Arrow), a 2016 episode of Arrow
 "Sins of the Father (Dynasty), a 1989 episode of the prime time soap opera Dynasty
 "Sins of the Father" (The New Batman Adventures), a 1997 episode of The New Batman Adventures
 "Sins of the Father" (Star Trek: The Next Generation), a 1990 episode of Star Trek: The Next Generation
 "Sins of the Father", a 1990 episode of Inspector Morse
 "Sins of the Father", a 2011 episode of NCIS
 "Sins of the Father", a 2011 episode of Robin Hood
 "Sins of the Father", a 2018 episode of Shooter
 "Sins of the Father", a 2022 episode of Dexter: New Blood
 "Sins of the Fathers", a 2011 episode of Haven
 "The Sins of the Father", a 2009 episode of Merlin
 "The Sins of the Fathers", a 1954 episode of The Motorola Television Hour
 "The Sins of the Fathers", a subtitle for the 1996 season of the Spider-Man animated TV series
 "Sins of the Fathers", a 2021 episode of S.W.A.T.

Music
 "Sins of the Father", a 1992 song by Black Sabbath from Dehumanizer
 "Sins of the Father", a 2011 song by Riot from Immortal Soul
 "Sins of the Father", a 2013 song by Akihiro Honda and Ludvig Forssell for the Metal Gear Solid V: The Phantom Pain trailer and video game
 "Sins of the Father", a 2015 song by Being as an Ocean from the self-titled album "Being As An Ocean"

Other
 Sins of Our Fathers, a 1995 album by Andy Prieboy
 Gabriel Knight: Sins of the Fathers, a 1993 video game by Sierra On-Line

See also
 Ancestral sin
 Sins of My Father (disambiguation)